The Norfolk SharX were briefly a member of the third Major Indoor Soccer League.  They began play in the 2011–2012 season., but on June 25, 2012, the team announced that because of economic hardship, the SharX would cease operations effective immediately and not return for the next season.

Year-by-Year

Final Squad

As of February 4, 2012

References

Indoor soccer clubs in the United States
Major Indoor Soccer League (2008–2014) teams
2011 establishments in Virginia
Association football clubs disestablished in 2012
Association football clubs established in 2011
Soccer clubs in Hampton Roads
2012 disestablishments in Virginia
Sports in Norfolk, Virginia
Soccer clubs in Virginia